A special election was held in  on August 8, 1805 to fill a vacancy left by the death of Representative James Gillespie (DR) on January 5, 1805, before the 9th Congress began, but after the general elections had taken place for the 8th Congress.

Election results

The first session of the 9th Congress began on December 2, 1805 so that this vacancy was filled prior to the first meeting of Congress.

See also
List of special elections to the United States House of Representatives

References

North Carolina 1805 05
North Carolina 1805 05
1805 05
North Carolina 05
United States House of Representatives 05
United States House of Representatives 1805 05